The 2019 NCAA Division I Football Championship Game was a postseason college football game that determined a national champion in the NCAA Division I Football Championship Subdivision for the 2018 season. It was played at Toyota Stadium in Frisco, Texas, on January 5, 2019, with kickoff at 12:00 noon EST, and was the culminating game of the 2018 FCS Playoffs.

Teams
The participants of the 2019 NCAA Division I Football Championship Game were the finalists of the 2018 FCS Playoffs, which began with a 24-team bracket. North Dakota State and Eastern Washington qualified for the Championship by winning their semifinal games. North Dakota State was the designated home team for the game.

North Dakota State Bison

The Bison, led by fifth-year head coach Chris Klieman, finished the regular season 11–0 and received the No. 1 seed and a first-round bye in the FCS Playoffs. They defeated Montana State, No. 8 seed Colgate, and No. 5 seed South Dakota State to reach the Championship Game. This was North Dakota State's seventh Championship Game appearance; they entered the game with a 6–0 record in previous finals, with their last coming in the 2017 playoffs.

Eastern Washington Eagles

The Eagles, led by second-year head coach Aaron Best, finished the regular season 9–2 and received the No. 3 seed and a first-round bye in the FCS Playoffs. They defeated Nicholls, No. 6 seed UC Davis, and No. 7 seed Maine to reach the Championship Game. This was Eastern Washington's second Championship Game appearance; their only previous appearance was in the 2010 playoffs, which they won.

Game summary

Scoring summary

Game statistics

References

External links
Box score at ESPN
FCS Football Championship 2019 Eastern Washington vs North Dakota State via YouTube

Championship Game
NCAA Division I Football Championship Games
Eastern Washington Eagles football games
North Dakota State Bison football games
American football in the Dallas–Fort Worth metroplex
Sports in Frisco, Texas
NCAA Division I Football Championship Game
NCAA Division I Football Championship Game